Muhamad Syahir bin Bashah (born 16 September 2001) is a Malaysian professional footballer who plays as a midfielder for Malaysia Super League club Selangor.

Club career

Perak

Born in Ipoh, Perak, he just recently started his professional football career with Perak and was then promoted to the senior team for 15 matches. He made his debut for Perak on 9 May 2021 in a dramatic 2–3 loss against Sri Pahang in the league match.

Selangor

On 30 December 2021, Syahir joined Selangor, where he signed a contract until the end of the 2022 season. He scored his first professional goal and for the club against Harini at Malaysia FA Cup on 11 March, in an eventual 6–0 victory at home. Later, he scored his first career league goal for the club, in which his side won 2–0 against Penang at home.

International career

Youth
Syahir was selected by Malaysia under-23 coach Brad Maloney for the 2021 Southeast Asian Games in Vietnam.  On 11 May, in the group stage against Laos, he scored a debut national youth goal in an eventual 3–1 win.

Career statistics

Club

References

External links
 

2000 births
Living people
People from Perak
Malaysian footballers
Association football midfielders
Perak F.C. players
Selangor FA players
Malaysia Super League players
Competitors at the 2021 Southeast Asian Games
Southeast Asian Games competitors for Malaysia